Dalian Medical University is a university in Dalian, Liaoning, China under the provincial government. It was founded in 1947.

In October 2007, it moved to the new campus in Lushunkou District, Dalian, which is across Lushun South Road from Dalian University of Foreign Languages' new campus.

The school through its Dalian Medical University Plastination Co. subsidiary is the source of the cadavers which have undergone plastination to appear worldwide in the BODIES... The Exhibition.

The school currently has 1 national key discipline, 4 first-class construction disciplines in Liaoning Province, and 4 first-class characteristic disciplines in Liaoning Province. 2 disciplines enter the top 1% of ESI global institutions. There are 4 post-doctoral research stations, 4 first-level discipline doctorate authorization points, 1 professional doctorate authorization point; 11 first-level discipline authorization authorization points, and 6 professional temporary authorization points. One was awarded by the Ministry of Education's innovation team, and two of them were selected as young leaders in science and technology innovation in the Ministry of Science and Technology Innovation Talent Promotion Plan. The school has now developed to be medically focused, it is a key construction university of a first-class university in Liaoning Province.

Affiliated Hospitals 
The First Affiliated Hospital of Dalian Medical University 

The Second Affiliated Hospital of Dalian Medical University 

The Third Hospital of Dalian Medical University

References

External links
Dalian Medical University

Educational institutions established in 1947
Universities in China with English-medium medical schools
Universities and colleges in Dalian
Medical schools in China
1947 establishments in China